Ceratophysella gibbosa is a species of springtails in the family Hypogastruridae.

References

Collembola
Articles created by Qbugbot
Animals described in 1940